Marisol Mora Cuevas (27 May 1970 – 24 or 25 June 2012) was a Mexican politician from the National Action Party. From 2006 to 2009 she served as Deputy of the LX Legislature of the Mexican Congress representing Veracruz. She also served as municipal president of Tlacojalpan.

On 24 June 2012 she was abducted at the exit of a party's event, she was found dead on 28 June with signs of suffocation.

References

1970 births
2012 deaths
Politicians from Veracruz
Women members of the Chamber of Deputies (Mexico)
National Action Party (Mexico) politicians
Municipal presidents in Veracruz
Assassinated Mexican politicians
21st-century Mexican politicians
21st-century Mexican women politicians
Women mayors of places in Mexico
Members of the Chamber of Deputies (Mexico) for Veracruz